Bosquet is a surname. Notable people with the surname include:

 Don Bosquet (born 1948), Rhode Island–based cartoonist
 Joseph Bosquet, chemist and palaeontologist at Maastricht, Belgium
 Pierre Bosquet (1810–1861), Marshal of France
 Bosquet (composer), 14th-century French composer